(English titles include: Growing Up, Adolescence, Growing Up Twice, and Child's Play) is a 1955 Japanese drama film directed by Heinosuke Gosho. It is based on Higuchi Ichiyō's 1895-1896 novella Takekurabe.

Plot
In a downtown area of Meiji era Edo, in the Yoshiwara red light district, teenage boy Shinnyo, son of a buddhist priest, helplessly witnesses not only his sister Ohana being sold as a concubine by his money-loving father, but also the fate of Midori, a neighbourhood girl to whom he has an unspoken affection, who is destined to become a courtesan like her older sister Omaki.

Cast
 Hibari Misora as Midori
 Keiko Kishi as Omaki
 Mitsuko Yoshikawa as Orin, Midori's mother
 Zeko Nakamura as Gosuke, Midori's father
 Eijirō Yanagi as owner of the Daikokuya
 Takashi Kitahara as Shinnyo
 Setsuko Shinobu as Shinnyo's mother
 Takamaru Sasaki as Shinnyo's father
 Kurayoshi Nakamura as Sangoro
 Yūko Mochizuki as Sangoro's mother
 Takeshi Sakamoto as Sangoro's father
 Akira Hattori as Chokichi
 Kyū Sazanka as Tatsugoro, Chokichi's father
 Matsumoto Kōshirō (credited Somegorō Ichikawa) as Shōtarō
 Kikue Mouri as Shōtarō's grandmother
 Atsuko Ichinomiya as messenger
 Iida Chōko as Baayaotoki
 Isuzu Yamada as Okichi
 Hatae Kishi
 Kyū Sakamoto (uncredited)

Production and legacy
Takekurabe was independently produced by Tsūjin Fukushima's company "New Art Productions", which resulted in budgetary constraints and compromises in the filming. It received mixed reviews during its initial run for being "overliterary" and the casting of pop star Hibari Misora. Film scholar Donald Richie and Gosho biographer Arthur Nolletti later called Takekurabe an "outstanding example" (Nolletti) of the Meiji-mono (Meiji period film) and "one of the finest due to its excellent sets" (by Kubo Kazuo), "its superb photography and the nearly perfect performances" (Richie).

Awards
Blue Ribbon Award for Best Supporting Actress Isuzu Yamada in Takekurabe and Ishigassen

References

External links
 

1955 films
1955 drama films
Japanese drama films
Japanese black-and-white films
Films based on short fiction
Films directed by Heinosuke Gosho
Shintoho films
Films scored by Yasushi Akutagawa
1950s Japanese films